Plough Monday is the traditional start of the English agricultural year. While local practices may vary, Plough Monday is generally the first Monday after Epiphany, 6 January. References to Plough Monday date back to the late 15th century. The day before Plough Monday is sometimes referred to as Plough Sunday.

History

The day traditionally saw the resumption of work after the Christmas period in some areas, particularly in northern England and East England. The customs observed on Plough Monday varied by region, but a common feature to a lesser or greater extent was for a plough to be hauled from house to house in a procession, collecting money. They were often accompanied by musicians, an old woman or a boy dressed as an old woman, called the "Bessy," and a man in the role of the "fool." 'Plough Pudding' is a boiled suet pudding, containing meat and onions. It is from Norfolk and is eaten on Plough Monday.

William Hone made use of Observations on the Popular Antiquities of Great Britain: Including the Whole of Mr. Bourne's Antiquitates Vulgares (1777) by the antiquary John Brand. Brand's work (with additions by Henry Ellis) mentions a northern English Plough Monday custom also observed in the beginning of Lent. Evidently the Plough dance depicted by Phiz in his illustrations for Harrison Ainsworth's 1858 novel Mervyn Clitheroe, and Ainsworth's description, is based on this or a similar account:

In the Isles of Scilly, locals would cross-dress and then visit their neighbours to joke about local occurrences. There would be guise dancing (folk-etymologically rendered as "goose dancing" by either the authors or those whom they observed) and considerable drinking and revelry.

Modern observances

Plough Monday customs declined in the 19th century but were revived in some towns in the 20th.  They are now mainly associated with Molly dancing and a good example can be seen each year at Maldon in Essex.

Whittlesey Straw Bear festival

Instead of pulling a decorated plough, during the 19th century, men or boys would dress in a layer of straw and were known as Straw Bears who begged door to door for money. The tradition is maintained annually in January in Whittlesey, near Peterborough, where on the preceding Saturday, "the Straw Bear is paraded through the streets of Whittlesey".

Goathland Plough Stots
Based in Goathland, North Yorkshire, on every Plough Monday, the troop perform a Long Sword dance.

In other countries
In certain regions of Belgium, the Monday after the Epiphany is called Verloren Maandag (literally lost Monday, indicating a day with no work and hence no pay) with typical food associated.

See also 
 Royal Ploughing Ceremony in Southeast Asia
 Pluguşorul

References

External links 
 Plow Monday songs with references

Holidays in England
January observances
English culture
Epiphany (holiday)
Christian festivals and holy days
Winter events in England